Streptomyces synnematoformans is a bacterium species from the genus of Streptomyces which has been isolated from soil from a sand dune in Egypt.

See also 
 List of Streptomyces species

References

Further reading

External links
Type strain of Streptomyces synnematoformans at BacDive -  the Bacterial Diversity Metadatabase

synnematoformans
Bacteria described in 2007